Beyoncé is an American singer, songwriter, actress, and entrepreneur. Throughout the course of her career, Beyoncé has won 29 MTV Video Music Awards, making her the most-awarded artist in the award show history. Beyoncé is also the most-awarded artist at the BET Awards and the Soul Train Awards. With a total of 32 awards and 88 nominations from the Grammy Awards for her music (including her work in Destiny's Child and The Carters), she is the most-awarded and most nominated (tied alongside her husband Jay-Z) artist in Grammy history. With 27 awards, Beyoncé is the third-most awarded artist at the Billboard Music Awards.

In 2002, she received Songwriter of the Year from American Society of Composers, Authors and Publishers becoming the First African American woman to win the award. In 2004 and 2019, she received NAACP Image Award for Entertainer of the Year and the Soul Train Music Award for Sammy Davis Jr. – Entertainer of the Year. In 2005, she also received APEX Award at the Trumpet Award honoring achievements of Black African Americans. In 2007, Beyoncé received the International Artist of Excellence award by the American Music Awards. She also received Honorary Otto at the Bravo Otto. The following year, she received the Legend Award for Outstanding Contribution to the Arts at the World Music Awards and the Career Achievement Award at the LOS40 Music Awards. In 2010, she received the Artist of the Decade Award at the NRJ Music Awards. At the 2011 Billboard Music Awards, Beyoncé received the inaugural Billboard Millennium Award. Beyoncé received the Michael Jackson Video Vanguard Award at the 2014 MTV Video Music Awards. In 2016, she received the Fashion Icon Award from the Council of Fashion Designers of America. In 2017, Beyoncé won a Peabody Award for Entertainment. In 2019, Beyoncé received the GLAAD Vanguard Award. According to Fuse in 2014, Beyoncé is the second most awarded recording artist of all time.

Although music is her primary source of accomplishment, Beyoncé has also received nominations and awards for other works in retail, image, philanthropy, film, and television. Those include eight Primetime Emmy Award nominations and a nomination for a Golden Globe Awards for Best Performance by an Actress in a Motion Picture – Musical or Comedy for her role in the movie Dreamgirls. She also received a Critics' Choice Movie Award in 2007 for Listen. In 2012, she was honored by New York Association of Black Journalists for writing Essence article "Eat, Pray, Love". She has also received numerous honors for her philanthropy, such as being inducted into the International Pediatric Hall of Fame in 2008 by the Miami Children's Hospital Foundation, and the Key to the City of New Orleans and Columbia, South Carolina.

Awards and nominations

Other accolades

State honors

World records

See also
 List of awards and nominations received by Destiny's Child
 List of awards and nominations received by The Carters
 Grammy Award records

Notes

References

Footnotes

Bibliography

 

Awards
Beyonce
Beyonce
Beyonce